Maria Nikolaeva Velcheva (born 14 October 1976) is a Bulgarian chess player who received the FIDE title of Woman Grandmaster (WGM) in 1999. She is a five-time winner of the Bulgarian Women's Chess Championship (1996, 1997, 1999, 2000, 2001).

Biography
From 1990 to 1996 Maria Velcheva played for Bulgaria at the European Youth Chess Championship and at the World Youth Chess Championship in different age groups, where the best result was shown in 1995 in Holon, when she won the European Girl's Chess Championship in the age group U20. She won five times the Bulgarian Women's Chess Championship: 1996, 1997, 1999, 2000 and 2001. Multiple winner of various international chess tournaments, including winning in Pula (1998), in Bucharest (1999) and in women's classification in Biel Chess Festival (2000).

In 2008, in Nalchik Maria Velcheva participated in the Women's World Chess Championship 2008, where in the first round lost Anna Muzychuk.

Played for Bulgaria at eight Women's Chess Olympiads (1996-2010)  and five Women's European Team Chess Championships (1999-2007).

References

External links
 
 
 

1976 births
Living people
People from Mezdra
Bulgarian female chess players
Chess woman grandmasters
Chess Olympiad competitors